John Bolton or Button (by 1524 – 1556 or later) was an English politician. He was a Member (MP) of the Parliament of England for Haverfordwest in 1555.

References

Year of death missing
People from East Grinstead
Members of the Parliament of England (pre-1707) for constituencies in Wales
Year of birth uncertain
English MPs 1555